Ramón Laureano Jr. (born July 15, 1994) is a Dominican professional baseball outfielder for the Oakland Athletics of Major League Baseball (MLB). He made his MLB debut in 2018.

Early life
Ramón Laureano is the only son of Nina and Ramón Laureano. He was raised in Santo Domingo, Dominican Republic.

Career

Houston Astros
Laureano played college baseball at Northeastern Oklahoma A&M College and was drafted by the Houston Astros in the 16th round of the 2014 Major League Baseball draft. He made his professional debut with the Greeneville Astros in 2014 and batted .189 with one home run and two RBIs in 16 games, and played 2015 with the Quad Cities River Bandits, batting .265 with four home runs, 34 RBIs and 18 stolen bases. Laureano started 2016 with the Lancaster JetHawks and was promoted to the Corpus Christi Hooks in July. Laureano finished 2016 with a combined .319 batting average along with 15 home runs, 73 RBIs and a .955 OPS in 116 total games between both teams. He returned to Corpus Christi in 2017 where he posted a .227 batting average with 11 home runs, 55 RBIs and 24 stolen bases.

Oakland Athletics
After the 2017 season, Laureano was eligible to be selected during the Rule 5 draft. Instead of placing him on the 40-man roster to prevent his selection, the Astros traded Laureano to the Oakland Athletics in exchange for pitcher Brandon Bailey on November 20, 2017.

On August 3, 2018, the Athletics called up Laureano, and he made his major league debut. His first major league hit that night was a walk-off single to break a scoreless tie in the 13th inning against the Detroit Tigers. Since the RBI became a stat in 1920, Laureano is the first Athletic to hit a walk-off RBI hit as their first major league hit. On August 20, 2018, he hit his first two major league home runs off Bartolo Colón in a 9–0 shutout victory over the Texas Rangers. On September 7, 2018, he hit two more home runs in an 8–4 win over the Rangers, becoming the first player in A's franchise history to have two multi-homer games in his first 30 career games, achieving the feat in 29 games played.

On May 7, 2019, Laureano robbed Joey Votto of a home run in the sixth inning against the Cincinnati Reds, which would aid Mike Fiers's second career no-hitter. In 2019, Laureano batted .288 with 24 home runs and 67 RBIs. On defense he led all major league center fielders in errors, with 7, and had the lowest fielding percentage of all major center fielders (.974). In the Wild Card Game, Laureano drove in the Athletics' only run with a sacrifice fly. The Athletics were defeated 5–1 by the Tampa Bay Rays.

On August 9, 2020, Laureano was ejected for the first time in his career for charging at the Houston Astros bench to go after Astros hitting coach Alex Cintrón, causing the benches to empty. He was suspended six games on August 11 due to the incident, while Cintron was suspended for 20. On appeal, Laureano's suspension was reduced to four games, beginning on August 14.

In 2020, he batted .213, with 6 home runs, 25 RBIs, posted a .338 on-base percentage and a .366 slugging percentage. He had an AL-leading 12 hit by pitches.

On August 6, 2021, Laureano was suspended by MLB for 80 games for testing positive for the performance enhancing drug nandrolone. On October 1, Laureano underwent core surgery. His suspension continued through the first 27 games of the 2022 season.

On May 8, 2022, Laureano played his first game after his suspension. On July 11, 2022, Laureano misplayed a sinking line drive hit by the Rangers’ Josh Smith, resulting in an inside-the-park home run.

On January 13, 2023, Laureano signed a one-year, $3.55 million contract with the Athletics, avoiding salary arbitration.

Skills profile
Laureano has drawn attention for the strength and accuracy of his arm.

References

External links

1994 births
Living people
Corpus Christi Hooks players
Dominican Republic expatriate baseball players in the United States
Dominican Republic sportspeople in doping cases
Glendale Desert Dogs players
Greeneville Astros players
Lancaster JetHawks players
Las Vegas Aviators players
Major League Baseball outfielders
Major League Baseball players from the Dominican Republic
Nashville Sounds players
Oakland Athletics players
Quad Cities River Bandits players
Sportspeople from Santo Domingo